Babafaraji (also Romanized as Bābāfarajī; also known as Bāfarajī) is a village in Zavin Rural District, Zavin District, Kalat County, Razavi Khorasan Province, Iran. At the 2006 census, its population was 237, in 56 families.

See also 

 List of cities, towns and villages in Razavi Khorasan Province

References 

Populated places in Kalat County